Ring finger protein 5 pseudogene 1, also known as RNF5P1, is a human gene.

References

Further reading

RING finger proteins
Pseudogenes